Douglas Rock is a rock located between Lantau Island and Hong Kong Island, Hong Kong. Administratively it belongs to the Islands District. There are currently no residents on the island.

References 

 Islands District
 Uninhabited islands of Hong Kong
Islands of Hong Kong